Kjell Arne Bratli (born 25 August 1948), Parliamentary Commissioner for the Norwegian Armed Forces 2006–2014. Military officer and author. Captain RNoN. Served at sea, land and in special service. In the 1980s he travelled behind Soviet lines in Afghanistan.  
Captain Bratli played a key role in building Rapid Response Information Teams in the NATO Alliance and NATO APIC (Allied Press and Information Centres), as well as modernizing the Norwegian Navy P&I units. He is an active member of the Norwegian Reserve Officer Federation as well as in the CIOR (the NATO reservist organization). He is former editor in the daily press and military periodicals, a former member of the board of the Atlantic Committee and Member of DCAF Director's advisory board. 
Bratli was appointed and served as special adviser to the Presidium of the Norwegian Parliament before being elected to the high office of Military Commissioner. 
He has written more than twenty books. Many about Military and Naval History, National Security, Christianity and Golf. In 2013 Bratli bought the Kurud estate, with a private golf course, Gjersjoen, near Oslo, Norway. Bratli is a member of the prestigious Royal and Ancient Golf Club of St. Andrews.

Select bibliography 
Norway's Security and European Foreign Policy for the 1980s. 1979
Kåre Willoch - Our New Prime Minister. 1981
Horten's Sports Club Through 125 Years. 1985
Behind the Open Door. 1986
The Last Years. An account from a Naval Yard. 1986
From the Golden Horn to the Trade Union Battle. 1990
100 years of private banking, Horten. 1991
Year of Golf. 1993
Naval Officer and Pillar of Society. 1994
How to Become a Golfer. 1995
Korsets Vei - en beretning om Smiths Venner. 1995
The Way Of The Cross. Canada, USA, England. 1996
Der Weg des Kreuzes. Germany, Austria, Switzerland. 1996
Een Levenskrachtige Gemeente. Holland 1996
Birdie - Golf Madness (Birdie - Golfens Glade Galskaper). 1996
Voyage to Heaven's Coast. 1997
The Great Book of Golf. 1997
Oh, Pharao, What a Shot! 1997
Operation Bagdad. 1998
Soldier of the Lord. 1998
The Destroyer "Sleipner" 1940-45.1999
Borre Golf Club. 1999
Fighting for HM the King. The Royal Norwegian Navy 1940-45. 2000
Paradise Right Ahead. 2000
Day by Day. Royal Norwegian Navy 1814-2000. 2001. (Producer)
The Ombudsman for the Armed Forces 1952-2002
Ramsund Naval Station. 2003
A servant of the Lord. 2003
Driving Forces - Horten College of Engineering 1855-2005. 2005
The Lord's Shepherd. 2007

External links
Portrettintervju av Bratli i Forsvarets forum

See also
Parliamentary Ombudsman

1948 births
Living people
Royal Norwegian Naval Academy alumni
Royal Norwegian Navy personnel
Military Ombudspersons
Ombudsmen in Norway
Norwegian writers